Slovak Australians are Australian citizens of full or partial Slovak ancestry or a person born in Slovakia who resides in Australia. Approximately 12,000 residents in Australia report to have Slovak ancestry.

History

Notable Slovak Australians
 Michael Dzian (born 1929), businessman 
 Renée Geyer (born 1953), singer
 Jarmila Gajdošová (born 1987), tennis player

See also
 European Australians
 Europeans in Oceania
 Immigration to Australia
 Slovak Americans

References

European Australian
Slovak diaspora
Main